State Route 221 (SR 221) is a  long state highway located entirely within Benton County, Washington, United States. The highway serves to connect the unincorporated community of Paterson to the county seat Prosser. The highway has existed since at least 1926 and was designated as Primary State Highway 8E from 1937 until the 1964 renumbering of Washington state highways.

Route description

SR 221 starts at an intersection with SR 14 in the unincorporated community of Paterson. After leaving Paterson the highway travels north through rural farm land as a two-lane highway. After the highway resumes its northerly course it climbs into the Horse Heaven Hills, gaining a passing lane through the uphill segments, before finally terminating at SR 22 in south Prosser.

Every year the Washington State Department of Transportation (WSDOT) conducts a series of surveys on its highways in the state to measure traffic volume. This is expressed in terms of average annual daily traffic (AADT), which is a measure of traffic volume for any average day of the year. In 2009, WSDOT calculated that as few as 2,000 cars traveled through the central part of the highway, and as many as 2,500 cars at the interchange with SR 22.

History
The roadway on its current alignment has existed since at least 1926, however there are records of a road between Paterson and Prosser since 1906. The highway was designated Secondary State Highway 8E (SSH 8E) in 1937, but the route number was changed to SR 221 during the 1964 state highway renumbering.

High winds have forced the closure of SR 221 in 2003, 2004, and 2005 due to large amounts of dust being blown around, causing visibility to drop to almost zero through the Horse Heaven Hills.

Major intersections

References

External links

 Highways of Washington State

Transportation in Benton County, Washington
221